Drewvale is an outer suburb of the City of Brisbane, Queensland, Australia.

Geography

Drewvale is located at the interchange of the Gateway Motorway and the Logan Motorway. It is the fourth most southern suburb of Brisbane, after Parkinson, Larapinta and Heathwood. However, Drewvale contains the southernmost residential properties in Brisbane, as the southern extents of Parkinson, Heathwood and Larapinta contain only industrial and commercial development.

History
The area was farmed by the Drew family from the 1870s. The locality was unofficially known as Drewvale for nearly a century, but was officially named Drewvale by the Queensland Place Names Board on 1 November 1971.

The median age of the Drewvale population was 31 years of age, 6 years below the Australian median.  57.8% of people living in Drewvale were born in Australia, compared to the national average of 69.8%; the next most common countries of birth were New Zealand 8.4%, England 3.5%, India 3.2%, South Africa 2.2%, Fiji 1.7%.  67.8% of people spoke only English at home; the next most popular languages were 3.2% Mandarin, 3% Hindi, 2% Cantonese, 1.4% Romanian, 1.2% Arabic.

Education 
There are no schools in Drewvale. The nearest government primary and secondary school is the Stretton State College in neighbouring Stretton.

References

External links
 
 

Suburbs of the City of Brisbane